Sam Luckley (born 29 November 1995) is a Scotland international rugby league footballer who plays as a  or  for Hull Kingston Rovers in the Betfred Super League.

He previously played for the Newcastle Thunder in League 1. He has also played for the Salford Red Devils in the Super League and spent time on loan from the Red Devils at the Swinton Lions in the Betfred Championship.

In 2021 he made his Salford début in the Super League against the Warrington Wolves.

References

External links
Salford Red Devils profile
SL profile
Luckley hopes to be lucky in 2021
Sam Luckley swaps Newcastle United dream for potential Super League stardom after unexpected Salford chance
Scotland international Sam Luckley joins Ottawa Aces
Scotland profile
Scotland RL profile

1995 births
Living people
Hull Kingston Rovers players
Newcastle Thunder players
Rugby league players from Kirkcaldy
Rugby league second-rows
Rugby league props
Rugby league locks
Salford Red Devils players
Scotland national rugby league team players
Scottish rugby league players
Swinton Lions players